Myeongjong of Goryeo (8 November 1131 – 3 December 1202) (r. 1170–1197) was 19th monarch of the Goryeo dynasty of Korea.  He was the third son of King Injong.

Although it was intended that Injong's second son should succeed his father, he was assassinated because Jeong Jung-bu feared that he might become a threat to him in the future. Myeongjong was a weak king, and was merely on the throne to show the general populace they still had a king, as the true rulers were the military leaders. His reign saw constant bloodshed as well as the deaths of the rebels Chung Jung-bu, Yi Ui-bang, and Yi Ui-min (not related to Yi Ui-Bang) but also the hero, Gyeong Dae-seung (General Gyeong was in fact the most loyal of the military leaders. Yet Myeongjong hated and mistrusted him because of his popularity with the populace).

After twenty-seven years on the throne, he was sent into exile by the military ruler of the time, Choe Chung-heon, and Injong's fifth son, King Sinjong, was placed on the throne.

Family
Father: Injong of Goryeo (고려 인종)
Grandfather: Yejong of Goryeo (고려 예종)
Grandmother: Queen Sundeok (순덕왕후)
Mother: Queen Gongye (공예왕후)
Grandfather: Im Won-hu (임원후)
Grandmother: Grand Lady of Jinhan State of the Bupyeong Yi clan (진한국대부인 부평 이씨)
Consort and their Respective issue(s):
Queen Uijeong of the Gim clan (의정왕후 김씨); half second cousin once removed.
Crown Prince Wang Yeong (태자 왕영)
Princess Yeonhui (연희궁주)
Princess Suan (수안궁주)
Concubine Myeong-Chun (명춘; d. 1180)
Concubine Sun-Ju (순주; d. 1179)
Unknown
Little Prince Wang Seon-sa (소군 왕선사)
Little Prince Wang Hong-gi (소군 왕홍기)
Little Prince Wang Hong-chu (소군 왕홍추)
Little Prince Wang Hong-gyu (소군 왕홍규)
Little Prince Wang Hong-gyun (소군 왕홍균)
Little Prince Wang Hong-gak (소군 왕홍각)
Little Prince Wang Hong-yi (소군 왕홍이)
Royal Lady Wang (왕녀 왕씨) – married Yi Hwa-ryong (이화룡)

Popular culture
 Portrayed by Kim Byung-se in the 2003-2004 KBS TV series Age of Warriors.

Notes and references

See also
 History of Korea
 List of Korean monarchs

1131 births
1202 deaths
12th-century Korean monarchs
People from Kaesong